Porzi (also Romanized as Porzī; also known as Pordī and Yūzī) is a village in Alamarvdasht Rural District, Alamarvdasht District, Lamerd County, Fars Province, Iran. At the 2006 census, its population was 104, in 24 families.

References 

Populated places in Lamerd County